The 2019 FIFA Beach Soccer World Cup was the 10th FIFA Beach Soccer World Cup, the premier international beach soccer championship contested by men's national teams of the member associations of FIFA. Overall, this was the 20th edition of a world cup in beach soccer since the establishment of the Beach Soccer World Championships which ran from 1995 to 2004 but was not governed by FIFA. This was the fifth tournament to take place under the biennial basis; the World Cup now takes place once every two years, having taken place annually until 2009.

The tournament was confirmed publicly on 3 November 2017, during the annual FIFA Beach Soccer Workshop in Dubai as part of the recently renewed partnership between FIFA and Beach Soccer Worldwide (BSWW). In October 2018, it was announced that the tournament would take place in Paraguay in the city of Luque, near the capital, Asunción, between 21 November and 1 December 2019. Fifteen teams advanced through preliminary continental qualification competitions, which started in September 2018 and ended in July 2019, to join the hosts in the final tournament which included Belarus as the sole team making their debut at the finals and notably saw the third placed team of the previous edition, Iran, fail to qualify. This was the first FIFA tournament to be hosted by Paraguay, the first edition of the World Cup held in South America since 2007, and the first time a landlocked country hosted beach soccer's principal event.

Following two narrow loses, hosts Paraguay were eliminated at the group stage. Brazil were the defending champions, but were defeated at the quarter-finals stage by Russia in what was a repeat of the scenario of 2015, thereby condemning Brazil to their joint-worst ever result. Portugal won the tournament, besting Italy in the final to claim their second FIFA World Cup crown (following 2015) and third world title overall (including the 2001 World Championships); Italy collected a second runners-up medal, following 2008. For the first time, the podium teams were all European nations. Japan finished fourth, matching their best ever placing previously achieved in 2005. A joint-record tally of 286 goals were scored (with 2006).

Madjer of Portugal made his last international beach soccer tournament appearance at this competition. The all-time top scorer of the competition, often heralded as the best player of all time, announced his retirement following the final, aged 42.

Host selection
The bidding schedule to determine the hosts was as follows:

14 June 2018 – FIFA opens bidding process.
29 June 2018 – Deadline for national associations to declare interest of hosting to FIFA.
6 July 2018 – FIFA send documents detailing the application campaign and conditions of participation for associations to analyse.
27 July 2018 – Deadline for associations to agree to terms of documents and submit an official bid.
14 September 2018 – Deadline for nations to prepare and submit their complete bidding packages to be evaluated by FIFA.
26 October 2018 – Hosts announced by FIFA.

Countries known to have declared interest in bidding to host the competition are inclusive of but not exclusive to:

On 1 October 2018, the FIFA Organising Committee recommended hosting be awarded to Paraguay as they were the only association to make an official bid after the initial declaration of interest stage. Confirmation of the awarding of hosting rights to Paraguay was announced at the FIFA Council meeting in Kigali, Rwanda on 26 October 2018.

Qualification
A total of 16 teams qualified for the final tournament. In addition to Paraguay who qualified automatically as hosts, 15 other teams qualified from six separate continental competitions.

The slot allocation for each confederation was decided at the FIFA Council meeting on 26 October 2018.

Qualifying rounds

The process of qualification to the World Cup finals began on 9 September 2018 and ended on 27 July 2019.
AFC (3 slots): The qualifiers for Asian nations took place in Pattaya, Thailand between 7–17 March 2019.
CAF (2 slots): The qualifiers for African nations took place in Sharm El Sheikh, Egypt between 8–14 December 2018; its preliminary qualifying round took place between 9–22 September 2018.
CONCACAF (2 slots): The qualifiers for North American nations took place in Puerto Vallarta, Mexico between 13 and 19 May 2019.
CONMEBOL (2 slots + hosts): The qualifiers for South American nations took place in Rio de Janeiro, Brazil between 28 April – 5 May 2019.
OFC (1 slot): The qualifiers for Oceanian nations took place in Papeete, Tahiti between 17 and 22 June 2019.
UEFA (5 slots): The qualifiers for European nations took place in Moscow, Russia between 19 and 27 July 2019.

Qualified teams
Note: All appearance statistics below include only the FIFA era (since 2005); see: National team appearances in the FIFA Beach Soccer World Cup for inclusion of the pre-FIFA era (1995–2004) stats.

Venue
One venue was used in the city of Luque, part of the Greater Asunción area, on the grounds of the Paraguayan Olympic Committee headquarters.

The stadium was purpose-built for the tournament, having been constructed between January and August 2019. It was officially opened by FIFA president Gianni Infantino on 9 November 2019, under the nickname of the Paraguay national team, Los Pynandi, meaning "barefoot" in Guarani. The Paraguayan Football Association (APF) and FIFA funded the US$1.5 million cost of the concrete structure. The main arena was complemented by three external, floodlit training pitches located adjacent.

Organisation
The following were key milestones in the organisation of the tournament (not belonging of other sections):

A budget of US$8 million for the tournament was approved at the FIFA Council meeting in Bogota, Colombia on 16 March 2018. In March 2021, the final cost was reported under-budget at US$6.1 million.
FIFA delegates visited the proposed World Cup complex, meeting with members of the Paraguayan Football Association (APF) for the first time on 15 November 2018.
The dates of the competition were confirmed at the FIFA Council meeting in Miami, United States on 15 March 2019.
The Local Organising Committee (LOC) and FIFA officials held their first meeting together, the latter also conducting a second inspection of the venue, on 16 July 2019.
The official emblem and official match ball, the former a design inspired by Ñandutí, a traditional form of Paraguayan embroidered lace, was unveiled at the CONMEBOL Convention Centre in Asuncion, on 18 July 2019.
The "coordination" meeting, attended by the LOC, FIFA delegates and representatives of the sixteen participating teams, was held at the Bourbon Asunción Convention Hotel on 13 September 2019.
Press accreditation ran during October 2019 with the deadline to register for approval through the FIFA Media Channel, 31 October.
Tickets were made available online to the public on 25 October 2019.
Tigo Paraguay, Visión Banco and Cerveza Pilsen were announced as National Supporters of the tournament on 14, 19 and 20 November 2019 respectively.
The official promotional poster, designed to be "thought-provoking" and instantly command attention, based upon Guaraní culture features of feathers and native Paraguayan patterns of triangles and diamonds, was unveiled on 19 November 2019. Local marketing of the tournament, including only publishing the poster 48 hours before the tournament began, received criticism.

Match officials
FIFA chose 24 officials from 24 different countries to referee matches at the World Cup, who were revealed on 29 October 2019. At least one referee was representing each of the six confederations: four from the AFC, three from CAF, five from CONMEBOL, three from CONCACAF, one from the OFC and eight from UEFA.

The most matches any one referee officiated in was seven (Domínguez, Ostrowski, Benchabane, González, Ángeles, Namazov, Mammadov); however it was Ivo Moraes who officiated the most matches as lead referee (three), including the final. Only Hugo Pado and Sergio Soares were not appointed as first referee of any match, the latter also officiating in the fewest total matches (one).

Draw
The draw to split the 16 teams into four groups of four took place on 13 September 2019 at 19:30 PYT (UTC−4), at the CONMEBOL Convention Centre in Asunción, Paraguay. The draw was assisted by Roberto Acuna of Paraguay and Júnior of Brazil who both formerly represented their respective national teams at World Cups in both association football and beach soccer. CONMEBOL president, Alejandro Domínguez and Paraguayan Football Association (APF) president, Robert Harrison, also took part in the presentation.

For the purpose of the draw, the teams were divided into four pots each containing four teams. The teams were allocated into the respective pots based on their previous performances at recent World Cups, and their respective qualification tournaments. Initially, two teams from Pot 1 were automatically allocated to the groups – Paraguay, as the hosts, were assigned to position A1 and Brazil, as the defending champions, were assigned to position D1. Teams from the same confederation could not be drawn into the same group, except for UEFA for which one group was permitted to contain two, since UEFA are represented by five teams.

Squads

Each team had to name a preliminary squad of between 12 and 18 players. From the preliminary squad, the team had to name a final squad of 12 players (two of whom must be goalkeepers) by the FIFA deadline. Players in the final squad could be replaced by a player from the preliminary squad due to serious injury or illness up to 24 hours prior to kickoff of the team's first match.

The squads included a number of high-profile players who, at this tournament, made their final international beach soccer appearances, announcing their retirements following the conclusion of the competition. This included Portuguese captain and three-time world champion Madjer (1998 debut, 583 caps), 2009 runners-up, Swiss captain Moritz "Mo" Jaeggy (2003 debut, 355 caps) and his brother, Valentin Jaeggy (2005 debut, 321 caps).

Group stage

Each team earned three points for a win in regulation time, two points for a win in extra time, one point for a win in a penalty shoot-out, and no points for a defeat. The top two teams of each group advanced to the quarter-finals.

All times are local, PYST (UTC−3).

Tiebreakers
The ranking of teams in the group stage was determined as follows:

 Points obtained in all group matches;
 Goal difference in all group matches;
 Number of goals scored in all group matches;
 Points obtained in the matches played between the teams in question;
 Goal difference in the matches played between the teams in question;
 Number of goals scored in the matches played between the teams in question;
 Fair play points in all group matches (only one deduction could be applied to a player in a single match): 
 Drawing of lots.

Group A

Group B

Group C

Group D

Knockout stage

Bracket

Source: FIFA

Quarter-finals

Semi-finals
Heavy rain and strong winds threatened the postponement of the semi-finals and deterred fans from attending the matches.

Third place match

Final

Awards
After the final, FIFA presented individual awards to the three best players of the tournament, three top goalscorers, and to the best goalkeeper. In addition, a collective award was given to the team with the most points in the Fair Play ranking. Following this, the winners' trophy was awarded to Portugal.

Winners

Individual awards
Along with the eventual winners of the gold, silver and bronze ball awards, Takuya Akaguma (Japan), Rui Coimbra (Portugal), Gabriele Gori (Italy), Boris Nikonorov (Russia), Artur Paporotnyi (Russia), Fedor Zemskov (Russia) and Emmanuele Zurlo (Italy) were also announced as the candidates for the award in the initial ten-man shortlist.

The individual awards were all sponsored by Adidas, except for the FIFA Fair Play Award.

The goal of the tournament was decided via an online public vote from which there were ten options to choose from. The vote closed at 14:00 GMT on 9 December.

Statistics

Goalscorers
With 16 goals, Italian forward Gabriele Gori finished as top scorer for the second consecutive tournament, a feat achieved only once previously during the FIFA era of World Cups, by Madjer in 2005 and 2006. Having failed to score at the last edition, Madjer scored one goal at this edition (what would be his last ever at a World Cup following his subsequent retirement) to extend his record tally of goals at FIFA World Cups to 88 (and 140 at all global championships).

Assists

Discipline
Team & match statistics

Total number of yellow cards issued: 83
Average yellow cards per match: 2.59
Total number of red cards issued: 7
Average red cards per match: 0.22
First yellow card of the tournament:Heimanu Taiarui of Tahiti against Italy
First red card of the tournament:Heiarii Tavanae of Tahiti against Italy
Most cards issued (match): 7 (6 yellow, 1 red)Paraguay v Switzerland
Fewest cards issued (match): 0Japan v Switzerland,Belarus v United Arab Emirates,Nigeria v Oman,Brazil v Russia
Most yellow cards (team): 12
Most red cards (team): 2
Fewest yellow cards (team): 1

Total number of fouls committed: 389
Average fouls committed per match: 12.16
Most fouls committed (team, avg. per match): 10
Most fouls suffered (team, avg. per match): 10
Fewest fouls committed (team, avg. per match): 1
Fewest fouls suffered (team, avg. per match): 2
Total number of penalties awarded: 24 (17 converted, 71% rate)
Average penalties awarded per match: 0.75
Most penalties awarded (team): 4
Fewest penalties awarded (team): 0 

Player statistics

Red cards received : 1 Artur Paporotnyi Heiarii Tavanae Jonathan Torohia Victor Tale Yoao Rolón Ihar Bryshtel

Most yellow cards received : 3 Aleksey Makarov Alfioluca Chiavaro Guillermo Costa
Second yellow cards received : 1 Angelo Tchen

Sources: FIFA (team), FIFA (player), Penalties

Final standings

Media

Broadcasting rights
180 territories broadcast matches of the tournament.

The following tables are a summary of some notable and participating territories' broadcasting licensee holders.

Individual territories listed that are also part of regional deals show the additional broadcasting licenses in those territories.

Closing report

Social media
At the closing press conference on 30 November, head of FIFA Tournaments, Jaime Yarza reported that social media posts had generated over 46 million impressions, 1.7 million user interactions and 14 million video views, setting a new record for social media engagement of the FIFA Beach Soccer World Cup, which Yarza claimed showed the continued growth of the sport.

Economic impact
Prior to the tournament, the Paraguayan Football Association (APF) estimated the competition would generate US$5 million for the local economy. The actual economic impact was reported at three times this amount of US$15 million at the closing press conference.

Attendance figures
Despite struggling attendance figures, APF General Secretary Luis Kanonnikoff declared "we are happy with the attendance numbers of both locals and foreigners."

Notes

References

External links
, at FIFA.com
FIFA Beach Soccer World Cup Paraguay 2019, at Beach Soccer Worldwide
Beach Soccer World Cup 2019 – Final stage, at Beach Soccer Russia
FIFA Technical Report (published 25 March 2020)

 
2019
2019 in beach soccer
November 2019 sports events in South America
December 2019 sports events in South America
International sports competitions hosted by Paraguay
2019 in Paraguayan sport